Marinus Heijnes (8 March 1888 in Amsterdam – 12 February 1963 in De Kaag) was a Dutch impressionist artist who painted in the tradition of the Dutch Hague School. Heijnes had visited and painted in Switzerland (Ticino), Italy, France (Brittany, Côte d'Azur) and Sweden. Much of his work is about the Dutch lakeside near his village Kaag.

Education and work
Heijnes had his education at the Quellinusschool in Amsterdam. Most of his colourful work was made in oil on canvas or aquarel. Heijnes worked 'en plein air' which means painted outdoors. Heijnes was a member of Kunst Zij Ons Doel in Haarlem.

Heijnes's work was included in the 1939 exhibition and sale Onze Kunst van Heden (Our Art of Today) at the Rijksmuseum in Amsterdam.

Marinus Heijnes was father of the aquarellist Theodoor Heynes.

References

Bibliography
 , Lexicon Nederlandse Beeldende Kunstenaars 1750-1950, 1970
 , Lexicon van Nederlandsche Schilders en Beeldhouwers 1870–1940, 1944
 , Allgemeinem Lexikon der bildenden Künstler des XX. Jahrhunderts
 , Beeldend Nederland : biografisch handboek, 1993

External links
 

1888 births
1963 deaths
Dutch landscape painters
Painters from Amsterdam
People from Kaag en Braassem 
20th-century Dutch painters
Dutch male painters
20th-century Dutch male artists